Milić Drinčić (Teočin, Rudnička Nahiye, 1775Dublje, 14 July 1815) was a duke and revolutionary who participated in the First Serbian Uprising and Second Serbian Uprising.

Biography
At the beginning of the first Serbian uprising in 1804, he took part in Milan Obrenović's led attack on the mining town and soon achieved the rank of boluk-bashi. He distinguished himself in the battles near Čačak in 1805 and Užice in 1807.

At that time, Rudnička nahiye had four principalities: Brusnička, Morava, Kačer and Montenegro - headed by Milić Drinčić. The commander of all the mentioned principalities was Duke Miloš Obrenović. In 1811, he became the voivode of Podgora the Montenegrin principality (the area around Takovo), and in 1813 he did not escape but surrendered to the Turks, but he was constantly on guard and in 1814 seeing that his life was in danger he defected and hid in the mountains.

Only ten months after the failed First Serbian Uprising, on August 8, 1814, a meeting of knezes and voivodes took place in Topčider with the likes of Milić Drinčić, Radovan Grbović, Aksentije Miladinović, Lazar Mutap, Arsenije Loma, Vasilije Jovanović, Panta Ilić, Milivoje Tadić, Vasilije Pavlović, Georgije Lazarević, and of course Miloš Obrenović, who inaugurated the second insurgency. and attended the meeting followed by other meetings in Rudovci and Vreoci, the meeting in Takovo. As soon as the Second Serbian Uprising broke out, Drinčić and his company successfully suppressed the Turks and contributed a lot to the victory of the insurgents in the decisive battles of both Ljubić and Dublje, where he was killed. He was killed on gate of Turkish redoubt during battle of Dublje.

Literature
Vuk Stefanović Karadžić, Materials for Serbian History, Belgrade 1898.

References 

18th-century Serbian nobility
19th-century Serbian nobility
Serbian revolutionaries
1775 births
1815 deaths